The Titanes de Saltillo Fútbol Club, commonly known as Titanes, was a Mexican football club based in Saltillo. The club was founded on 2015, last played in the Liga Premier de Ascenso of Segunda División de México.

History
The team was founded in 2015 playing in the Tercera División. A year later the team got a place in the Segunda División - Liga Premier de Ascenso by renting the franchise belonging to C.D. Uruapan, a team that could not play in that division due to problems in their stadium. Manager Héctor Medrano led Titanes through its 2016 Serie A de México (third-tier) debut.

At the end of the 2016–17 season the team was relegated to what is now called Serie B, however, before the next season, the club changed owners, so Titanes was dissolved and gave way to Atlético Saltillo Soccer.

References

External links 

Association football clubs established in 2015
2015 establishments in Mexico
Segunda División de México
Defunct football clubs in Coahuila
Defunct football clubs in Mexico